Early photographers of York include:

 Edwin F Fox
 Bishops
 Fox Talbot
 William Hayes
 Roger Fenton
 William Pumphrey
 George Fowler Jones architect
 W. P. Glaisby
 Francis Frith
 J. W. (Mrs. Milward) Knowles
 Joseph Duncan

Early photos of York by some of these photographers can also be found online.

Early photography is generally reckoned to be pre-1900.

References

History of York
 York